Meckelia connexa is a species of ulidiid or picture-winged fly in the genus Meckelia of the family Ulidiidae.

References

Ulidiidae